Arenaria is a genus of flowering plants, within the family Caryophyllaceae.

Species of this genus are among those plants commonly known as "sandworts". Several species formerly classified within Arenaria are now classed in the genera Spergularia, Eremogone and Minuartia.

Species
Species accepted by the Plants of the World Online as of September 2021:

Arenaria acaulis 
Arenaria achalensis 
Arenaria aggregata 
Arenaria alfacarensis 
Arenaria algarbiensis 
Arenaria alpamarcae 
Arenaria altorum 
Arenaria andina 
Arenaria angustifolia 
Arenaria angustifolioides 
Arenaria antitaurica 
Arenaria aphanantha 
Arenaria arcuatociliata 
Arenaria armerina 
Arenaria aucheriana 
Arenaria balansae 
Arenaria balearica 
Arenaria benthamii 
Arenaria bertolonii 
Arenaria biflora 
Arenaria bisulca 
Arenaria boliviana 
Arenaria bourgaei 
Arenaria bryoides 
Arenaria bulica 
Arenaria capillipes 
Arenaria cariensis 
Arenaria carinata 
Arenaria catamarcensis 
Arenaria cerastioides 
Arenaria chiapensis 
Arenaria cikaea 
Arenaria ciliata 
Arenaria cinerea 
Arenaria conferta 
Arenaria conica 
Arenaria conimbricensis 
Arenaria controversa 
Arenaria crassipes 
Arenaria cretica 
Arenaria deflexa 
Arenaria delaguardiae 
Arenaria densissima 
Arenaria dicranoides 
Arenaria digyna 
Arenaria dyris 
Arenaria eliasiana 
Arenaria emarginata 
Arenaria engleriana 
Arenaria erinacea 
Arenaria filicaulis 
Arenaria fontqueri 
Arenaria fragillima 
Arenaria funiculata 
Arenaria geladaindongensis 
Arenaria gionae 
Arenaria globiflora 
Arenaria glochidisperma 
Arenaria goekyigitii 
Arenaria gothica 
Arenaria gracilis 
Arenaria grandiflora 
Arenaria graveolens 
Arenaria guicciardii 
Arenaria gypsostrata 
Arenaria halacsyi 
Arenaria hintoniorum 
Arenaria hispanica 
Arenaria hispida 
Arenaria horizontalis 
Arenaria humifusa 
Arenaria huteri 
Arenaria jamesoniana 
Arenaria kandavanensis 
Arenaria katoana 
Arenaria kotschyana 
Arenaria kurdica 
Arenaria ladyginii 
Arenaria lanuginosa 
Arenaria latisepala 
Arenaria leucadia 
Arenaria libanotica 
Arenaria ligericina 
Arenaria livermorensis 
Arenaria longipedunculata 
Arenaria ludens 
Arenaria luschanii 
Arenaria lycopodioides 
Arenaria macrocalyx 
Arenaria macrosepala 
Arenaria mairei 
Arenaria mandoniana 
Arenaria mattfeldii 
Arenaria mcneillii 
Arenaria merckioides 
Arenaria mexicana 
Arenaria microcalyx 
Arenaria minutissima 
Arenaria modesta 
Arenaria moehringioides 
Arenaria mons-cragus 
Arenaria montana 
Arenaria moritziana 
Arenaria muralis 
Arenaria musciformis 
Arenaria neelgherrensis 
Arenaria nevadensis 
Arenaria nitida 
Arenaria norvegica 
Arenaria obtusiflora 
Arenaria oligosperma 
Arenaria olloixii 
Arenaria orbicularis 
Arenaria orbiculata 
Arenaria orbignyana 
Arenaria oreophila 
Arenaria oresbia 
Arenaria pallens 
Arenaria paludicola 
Arenaria pamphylica 
Arenaria parvifolia 
Arenaria pedunculosa 
Arenaria peloponnesiaca 
Arenaria peruviana 
Arenaria peyritschii 
Arenaria phitosiana 
Arenaria × piifontii 
Arenaria pintaudii 
Arenaria pleurantha 
Arenaria poeppigiana 
Arenaria polytrichoides 
Arenaria pomelii 
Arenaria provincialis 
Arenaria pseudofrigida 
Arenaria pungens 
Arenaria puranensis 
Arenaria purpurascens 
Arenaria pycnophylla 
Arenaria pycnophylloides 
Arenaria querioides 
Arenaria radians 
Arenaria redowskii 
Arenaria reinholdiana 
Arenaria reptans 
Arenaria retusa 
Arenaria rhodia 
Arenaria rivularis 
Arenaria rotundifolia 
Arenaria runemarkii 
Arenaria sabulinea 
Arenaria saponarioides 
Arenaria saxigena 
Arenaria semiromica 
Arenaria serpens 
Arenaria serpyllifolia 
Arenaria sipylea 
Arenaria sivasica 
Arenaria smithiana 
Arenaria soratensis 
Arenaria speluncarum 
Arenaria standleyi 
Arenaria stuebelii 
Arenaria suffruticosa 
Arenaria taiwanensis 
Arenaria tejedensis 
Arenaria tenella 
Arenaria tenera 
Arenaria tequilana 
Arenaria tetragyna 
Arenaria tetraquetra 
Arenaria tmolea 
Arenaria tomentosa 
Arenaria uninervia 
Arenaria venezuelana 
Arenaria vitoriana 

Unresolved
Arenaria leptoclados

See also
Similar genera that have been taxonomically intertwined with Arenaria:
Spergula
Spergularia

References

External links
Jepson Manual Treatment
USDA Plants Profile: North American species

 
Caryophyllaceae genera